This article provides details of international football games played by the Armenia national football team from 2020 to present.

Results

2020

2021

2022

Forthcoming fixtures

Notes

References

2020s
Football in Armenia
2020s in Armenian sport